Cabbage Tree Point may refer to several places in Australia:

 Cabbage Tree Point (Brisbane), a headland in Shorncliffe, Brisbane, Queensland
 Cabbage Tree Point (Gold Coast), an unbounded locality within Steiglitz, Queensland